The lists of Uzbekistan national football team results.

Results by opposing team

Results by decade

1990s

2000s

2010s

2020s

Current season

2020

2019

Non-international matches

Best / Worst Results

Best

Worst

See also
 Uzbekistan national football team head-to-head record
 Uzbekistan women's national football team results

References